The ASEAN Association of Eye Hospitals (AAEH) is an organization that promotes the quality of ophthalmology by eye hospitals in South East Asia region. Founded in 2005 by Singapore National Eye Centre, the American Eye Centre of Philippines, the Jakarta Eye Centre of Indonesia, Rutnin Eye Hospital of Thailand and the Tun Hussein Onn National Eye Hospital of Malaysia.

History 
In 2007, AAEH jointed with the European Association of Eye Hospitals EAEH to found the World Association of Eye Hospitals (WAEH).

References

External links
 Asean Association of Eye Hospitals Official Website

Eye hospitals